Forbes George Vernon (21 August 1843 – 20 January 1911), Lieutenant (ret.) British Army, was a Member of the Legislative Assembly of the Canadian province of British Columbia from 1875 to 1882, and from 1886 to 1894, representing the riding of Yale. He ran for the constituency of Yale-East in 1894 following a redistribution, but was defeated by Donald Graham.

Forbes George was the third of five sons born to John Edward Venables Vernon of Clontarf Castle in the north of Dublin, by his first wife Louisa Catherine Bowles. He arrived in British Columbia the following September, with his elder brother Charles Albert Vernon (1840–1906) and their friend Charles Frederick Houghton.

In 1876, he was named Chief Commissioner of Lands and Works in the provincial cabinet and served until 1878. He later served in the same cabinet post from 1887 to 1894. After retiring from politics, Vernon served as Agent General for the province of British Columbia in London from 1895 to 1899.

He was married at Victoria 11 September 1877 to Katie Alma Branks of California; she died 31 March 1885 and was buried at Victoria. They had two daughters: Gladys Louise (1878–1892); and Beatrice Alma Ashley (1881–????), who went on to marry Captain Montague Furber.

Vernon died in London in 1911. The northern Okanagan city of Vernon was named after him.

References

External links 
Biographical note at British Columbia Archival Information Network
 

1843 births
1911 deaths
Politicians from County Dublin
Vernon, British Columbia
Members of the Legislative Assembly of British Columbia
Canadian ranchers
Irish emigrants to pre-Confederation British Columbia
19th-century Anglo-Irish people